A laundry sour is a chemical added to clothing during the final rinse cycle of a washing machine to lower the pH of the water and to assist with the removal of detergents and rust stains.  Most such sours are fluoride-based, including ammonium silicofluoride, ammonium bifluoride, and hydrofluosilicic acid; glycolic acid is also used.  The US Department of Defense recognizes two "types" of laundry sours: type I is sodium silicofluoride and sodium acid fluoride in powdered, crystal, or flake form; type II is ammonium bifluoride in flake form.

References

 Laundry substances